The 2011–12 Leinster Senior League Senior Division

Final Table

Results

References

Leinster Senior League Senior Division seasons
3
4
Ire